The Harvard World Model United Nations (WorldMUN) is an annual traveling model United Nations conference that is run by Harvard University and a local university team from a host city. WorldMUN moves to a new city each year and is regarded as one of the most prestigious international MUN conferences today. The Conference was first held in 1992. 
The Conference targets college students from all over the world who have a passion and interest to become a diplomat in the future.

General information and history
WorldMUN uses a competitive bidding process to select locations for each conference, with prospective host teams, usually consisting of the MUN societies of large universities, applying.

The conference is generally held in March.

WorldMUN uses the American style of model United Nations, with almost all delegates paired with another from their delegation (in dual delegations), with discussions occurring both inside and outside the rooms simultaneously.

Committees have in the past included committees of the United Nations General Assembly, the Security Council, the subcommittees of ECOSOC, regional bodies (such as the African Union or European Union), specialized agencies of the United Nations, crisis simulation committees and uniquely, simulations of the entire general assembly.

As most other conferences, there are also workshops, social events showcasing local culture and a global village, where participant teams can share delicacies and traditions from their home countries. In addition, WorldMUN has had many distinguished guest speakers over the years, notably Pope Francis in Rome and King Felipe VI in Madrid.

From 2016 onwards, the conference began giving out WorldMUN spirit awards to teams, for showing exceptional adherence to the spirit of WorldMUN and the United Nations. The team from Andrés Bello Catholic University (Venezuela) were the first recipients of this award.

The organization works closely with a social impact-oriented group, the Resolution Project, aimed at fostering global youth leadership. The Resolution Project was founded by WorldMUN Secretariat alumni.

The 29th edition of the conference was scheduled for Tokyo in March 2020, but it was cancelled and initially rescheduled to 2021. However, with the continued health safety concerns and the pandemic's prevailing impact on global travel, the Tokyo 2021 conference was rescheduled again to 2022. The 2021 conference will happen virtually over Zoom.

Conference activities

Committee sessions
Participants are assigned to represent countries, organizations, or leaders in order to debate pressing international issues in a simulated session of an intergovernmental organization (IGO). WorldMUN divides all its committees into three organs:

General Assembly

ECOSOC and Regional Bodies

Specialized Agencies

Social Venture challenge
The social venture challenge allows interested participants to compete for grants to implement their creative solutions for healthcare, education, human rights, technology, water, and other areas. This is through WorldMUN's partnership with the Resolution Project, a U.S. 501(c)3 nonprofit founded in 2007 by WorldMUN alumni, dedicated to empowering young leaders around the world through collaborative social entrepreneurship.

In-conference activities
These include in-conference trips and workshops.

Social events
WorldMUN also organizes social events, most of which look like the following:

 Night Zero: Before the conference kicks off, delegates and staff gather for a night out to inaugurate the conference.
 Global Village: Every year, WorldMUN starts off its social agenda with Global Village. This is the first opportunity for delegates to meet each other in a social setting. Delegations host a booth where they share traditions, delicacies, and more from their home countries.
 Featured night 1: An event for participants to experience the host city's local culture.
 Cabaret: Delegates showcase their talents on stage in the Cabaret on the third night.
 Featured night 2: Another event for participants to experience the host city's local culture.
 Farewell Party: Traditionally, WorldMUN closes with this final social event.

WorldMUN Conferences

See also

 Asia-Pacific Model United Nations Conference – another MUN travelling conference
 Harvard International Relations Council
 List of model United Nations conferences – a list of notable MUN conferences
 Model United Nations

References

External links 
 Official WorldMUN website

Model United Nations